Limon or limón, Spanish for "lemon", may refer to:

Places
 Limón Province, Costa Rica
 Limón (canton), a canton in the province
 Limón or Puerto Limón, the capital city of both the canton and province
 Roman Catholic Diocese of Limón, Costa Rica
 Limon, Nièvre, a commune in the Nièvre department of France
 Limón, Honduras, a municipality in the department of Colón
 Limón, Panama, a subdistrict
 Limon Bay, Panama
 Río Limón, Panama, a river
 Limon, Colorado, a Statutory Town in the United States
 Limon Correctional Facility, Colorado, a correctional facility in the above city
 Limón, Mayagüez, Puerto Rico, a barrio
 Limón, Utuado, Puerto Rico, a barrio
 Limón River, Venezuela

People
 Ada Limón (born 1976), American poet
 Carlos Madrazo Limón (born 1952), Mexican politician
 Donald Limon (1932–2012), British public servant, Clerk of the House of Commons from 1994 to 1997
 Emilio Limón (born 1988), Surinamese footballer
 Graciela Limón (born 1938), Latina novelist
 Harvey Limón (born 1975), Surinamese footballer
 Iyari Limon (born 1976), American actress
 Javier Limón (born 1973), Spanish record producer, singer and songwriter
 José Limón (1908–1972), Mexican-born American modern dancer and choreographer
 María Limón, American Chicana writer, poet and activist
 Marshall Limon (1915–1965), Canadian sprinter
 Martin Limón (born 1948), American novelist
 Michele Limon, Italian research associate and assistant professor of physics and astronomy
 Monique Limon (born 1953), French politician
 Monique Limón (born 1979), American politician
 Mordechai Limon (1924–2009), fourth commander of the Israeli navy
 Rafael Limón (born 1954), Mexican boxer
 Richarte Limón, English explorer and conquistador, participated in the founding of Buenos Aires
 Theodolinda Hahnsson (1838–1919), née Limón, Finnish writer and translator, first known female author to write in Finnish
 Limon Staneci (1916–1991), journalist born in Yugoslavia

Other uses
 Limón F.C., a football team in Puerto Limón, Costa Rica
, a ferry scrapped in 2005
 Loopy Limon, a flavor of Stars & Stripes soft drink

See also
 El Limón (disambiguation)
 Limón Group, a geologic group in Costa Rica
 State v. Limon, a Kansas Supreme Court case
 Limons, France, a commune
 Lymon, a portmanteau of lime and lemon, used to market Sprite